"Attitude" is a song by Brazilian heavy metal band Sepultura. It is the second single from their 1996 album Roots. The song remains a concert staple to this day. A music video was filmed for the single which features the band performing beside a mixed martial arts cage, in which various people (including businessmen and tribesmen) are fighting whilst being filmed. The Gracie family also appear in the video. At the end of the video, the crowd goes crazy and destroys the cage (which is similar to the end of Nirvana's "Smells Like Teen Spirit" music video) and Max Cavalera destroys his guitar. At the very end, the band and the Gracie family are seen taking photos. This video can be found on the VHS We Are What We Are, which was later released on DVD as part of Chaos DVD.

The song's lyrics were written by Max Cavalera's stepson Dana Wells, who also came up with the idea for the video. Dana was killed in an automobile accident not too long after the album was released, which was one of the catalysts for Max leaving the band and starting Soulfly, who perform a different version of "Attitude" named "The Song Remains Insane", although using the same set of lyrics. This refrain in particular also crops up again in the song "The Doom of All Fires" on Cavalera Conspiracy's debut album Inflikted.

The song also appears in live form on the band's live releases Under a Pale Grey Sky and Live in São Paulo.

Artwork
The cover of the single shows various people's Sepultura tattoos, which are shown to be on wrists, ankles and even foreheads. The reverse of the EP shows Dana Wells mid-stage-dive, and features a short eulogy from Max and Ozzy Osbourne. The concept for the tattoo cover was also developed by Dana.

Releases
The single was released on 2 CDs and 7" vinyl. The first CD was presented in a card foldout digipak case, while the second was in a standard slimline jewel case. Early copies of the digipak version were embossed with a stamp of the band's thorned 'S' logo. The vinyl was a strictly limited edition.

Track listing
CD1 (Digipak)
"Attitude"
"Kaiowas" (Tribal Jam) (new version of the song originally found on Chaos A.D.)
"Clenched Fist" (live)
"Biotech Is Godzilla" (live)

CD2
"Attitude"
"Lookaway" (Master Vibe mix) (remix of the song originally found on Roots)
"Mine" (featuring Mike Patton)

7" red vinyl
 "Attitude"
 "Dead Embryonic Cells" (live) (from Under Siege (Live in Barcelona))

Note that all of these B-sides except for "Dead Embryonic Cells" (live) and "Kaiowas" (Tribal Jam) would be collected on Blood-Rooted.

Cover versions
 Soulfly covers the song live. A recording of this can be found on the DVD, The Song Remains Insane.

Personnel
Max Cavalera – lead vocals, rhythm guitar, berimbau on "Attitude"
Igor Cavalera – drums
Andreas Kisser – lead guitar
Paulo Jr. – bass
Produced by Ross Robinson and Sepultura
Recorded and engineered by Ross Robinson
Mixed by Andy Wallace
Assistant engineer: Richard Kaplan

References

Sepultura songs
1996 singles
Songs written by Igor Cavalera
Songs written by Max Cavalera
Songs written by Andreas Kisser
Songs written by Paulo Jr.
1995 songs
Roadrunner Records singles
World music songs